The messmate pipefish (Corythoichthys haematopterus) is a species of marine fish in the family Syngnathidae. It is widespread throughout the tropical waters of the Indo-Pacific region, from the eastern coast of Africa to the Vanuatu Islands. This species can reach a length of 19.8 cm. It occasionally makes its way into the aquarium trade where it is known as the dragonfaced pipefish.
Other common names are bloodspot pipefish, reef pipefish, reeftop pipefish and yellow-streaked pipefish.

The messmate pipefish exhibits biofluorescence, that is, when illuminated by blue or ultraviolet light, it re-emits it as yellow, and appears differently than under white light illumination. Biofluorescence may assist in intraspecific communication and camouflage.

References

External links

http://www.marinespecies.org/aphia.php?p=taxdetails&id=217991
 

Corythoichthys
Fish described in 1851